The LAX Automated People Mover is an automated people mover (APM) system around the Los Angeles International Airport area, currently under construction for Los Angeles World Airports. To be operated by LAX Integrated Express Solutions, the LAX APM will run  and will have six stations that connect the Los Angeles Metro Rail, a consolidated rental car center (CONRAC) and two intermodal transportation facilities (ITF) with the airport's central terminal area (CTA).

Service description

Route description 
The LAX APM will run  and will have six stations.

The APM will serve three stations in the central terminal area (CTA) each with footbridges with moving walkways to nearby terminals. The west station will connect to terminals 3, 4, and B (the Tom Bradley International Terminal), the center station will connect to terminals 2, 5 and 6, and the east station will connect to terminals 1, 7 and 8.

Continuing to the east, the line will travel over Sepulveda Boulevard and skirt along the airfield where provisions have been made for a station to be added if a terminal 9 is built in the future.

At that point, the line turns to the north, crossing Century Boulevard to reach the LAX West Intermodal Transportation Facility (ITF), a large parking structure with a kiss and ride area and access to the LAX City Bus Center and nearby hotels.

From there, the route continues east along 96th Street, passing the line's maintenance yard and crossing over the Metro Rail tracks before arriving at the East ITF station which will offer access to the LAX/Metro Transit Center station when it opens in 2024 along with parking.

From there, trains travel a short distance to the east and enter the LAX Consolidated Rent-A-Car Facility (ConRAC), a massive parking structure that will house all of the major rental car companies that operate at LAX.

Hours and frequency 
The APM is expected to operate 24 hours a day. During peak hours (9 a.m. to 11 p.m.) trains will arrive every two minutes. The line will have a ten-minute end-to-end travel time.

Rolling stock 

The system's fleet will consist of 44 Innovia APM 300 vehicles built by Alstom (initially Bombardier Transportation). Each vehicle can accommodate up to 50 passengers and their luggage, with 12 seated and the rest standing. During peak periods, vehicles will operate in four-car trains, with nine trains on the line.

Station listing 
The following is the complete list of stations, from west to east.

History 
The Los Angeles International Airport has long struggled with gridlocked traffic on World Way, the main road that circles through the airport's central terminal area, that can often back up onto Century Boulevard or the Airport Tunnel, which connects the airport to Interstate 405 and Interstate 105 respectively.

Ahead of the 1984 Summer Olympics in Los Angeles, a second level was added to World Way, sending vehicles dropping off departing passengers to the upper level and those picking up arriving passengers to the lower.

The relief was short lived, and by the 2000s, the airport had ranked as one of the nation's most congested and hardest to navigate. That led airport managers to spend over US$15 billion to modernize the airport, with an automated people mover (APM) being one of the major improvements. The project was given added urgency in 2017 when Los Angeles was awarded its bid to host the 2028 Summer Olympics.

After receiving three bids, Los Angeles World Airports announced it had chosen LAX Integrated Express Solutions (LINXS) to design, build, finance, operate and maintain the APM for a period of 25 years. LINXS is a joint venture, public–private partnership of ACS, Alstom, Balfour Beatty, Fluor and Hochtief, with assistance from HDR and Flatiron West. The US$4.9 billion project was approved by the Los Angeles City Council on April 11, 2018.

Beyond the construction of the APM guideway and stations, LAX has also planned several projects that will enable or connect to the APM.

New vertical cores will be built near each terminal, enabling vertical movement of passengers with elevators and escalators, as well as pedestrian bridges over World Way with moving walkways to connect terminals to stations. LAX is building cores between terminals 5 and 6, at terminals 7 and at terminal B (the Tom Bradley International Terminal) at a cost of $490 million. New cores were also included in larger renovation projects at terminals 1, 2, 3 and 4.

The APM will also connect to the LAX West Intermodal Transportation Facility, a US$294.1 million, 4,300 space parking structure with a lot to pickup and drop off passengers and areas for shuttle buses, and the LAX Consolidated Rent-A-Car Facility (ConRAC), a massive parking structure that will house all of the major rental car companies that operate at LAX in one location located adjacent to Interstate 405.

All together, these projects are called the Landside Access Modernization Program and are expected to cost a total of US$5.5 billion.

In 2018, 2,100 parking spaces in lot C were removed to reconfigure the area for the West ITF. Utility relocation started in the second quarter of 2018. The guideway started construction in spring 2019.

Construction on the West ITF began in summer of 2019. The CONRAC broke ground in September 2019. The first large concrete pour for the APM occurred in September 2020 at the West ITF station.

The West ITF opened to the public on October 19, 2021, and will temporarily use buses to transport customers between the airport and the facility.

Progress
As of January 2023, most of the decking, glass panels, and roofing elements of the APM's six pedestrian bridges have now also been installed, leaving only metal ceiling and electrical components of their construction left before completion.

Gallery

References

External links 

 Automated People Mover – LAWA
 LAX Integrated Express Solutions (LINXS)

Airport people mover systems in the United States
Automated People Mover
Transportation in Los Angeles
2023 in rail transport
Proposed railway lines in California